Chelmsford High School is a public, coeducational high school founded in 1917. The current building is located in North Chelmsford, Massachusetts, United States, and was built in 1974. Before 1974 the high school was located in the current McCarthy Middle School building. It serves as the public high school for students in grades nine through 12 and has been ranked among the top 500 schools in the nation by Newsweek.

It is part of a central campus that includes four of the town's seven schools. The three other schools at the central campus are the C. Edith McCarthy Middle School, the Col. Moses S. Parker Middle School and the Charles D. Harrington Elementary School.

House structure
The school is based on a three-house system. The houses are named after Ralph Waldo Emerson, Nathaniel Hawthorne and John Greenleaf Whittier, three famous New England writers. When the school was built, there was an additional house named for Emily Dickinson. After a decade, the school branched out from the house system; the classes were no longer strictly divided into house hallways. Now, the house structure mainly serves administrative functions. Each house has two to three guidance counselors, a dean and an office. All students are assigned a house the year preceding their entrance into the school.

Renovations
The school has recently undergone extensive renovation. The renovations included a complete overhaul of all existing science classrooms as well as the construction of a second science wing in the space formerly used for district administration offices. New ceilings and floor tiles, electrical and HVAC upgrades, and a 1,000-seat state-of-the-art Performing Arts Center (P.A.C.) were added as well. The construction, completed in 2007, gave Chelmsford High School its own auditorium for the first time in its (then) 33-year history. Previously, any performances put on by the high school were held in the 600-seat auditorium of neighboring McCarthy Middle School, the town's former high school. The new P.A.C. serves as a forum for functions such as the performances by the school's music and theater programs and various assemblies. As of May 28, 2014 the P.A.C. has been named the "Carl Rondina Performing Arts Center" in honor of longtime chorus teacher and music director Carl Rondina who recently retired. More recently, renovations have been made in the gymnasium, applying a more modern look. 

Further facility upgrades completed in 2008 include new enclosed stairwells at the end of the two large classroom wings to improve building flow from floor to floor, as well as a renovated library media center. New lockers have also been installed in all sections of the building.

Athletics
The athletics teams from CHS compete in the Merrimack Valley Conference (MVC).
The MVC has long been considered one of the most competitive leagues on a state level.

Varsity sports offered include: 

Fall
 cheerleading 
 boys & girls cross country
 field hockey
 football
 golf,
 boys & girls soccer
 girls swimming & diving
 girls volleyball
Winter
 boys & girls basketball
 cheerleading 
 gymnastics 
 boys & girls ice hockey 
 boys & girls indoor track and field 
 boys & girls skiing 
 boys swimming & diving
 wrestling
Spring
 baseball 
 boys & girls lacrosse
 rugby
 softball 
 boys & girls tennis
 boys & girls outdoor track and field
 boys volleyball

Beginning in 2016–17, CHS entered into a cooperative girls hockey team with neighboring Billerica.
Beginning in 2018–19, CHS entered into a cooperative girls gymnastics team with neighboring Billerica and Tyngsboro.

Massachusetts state championships
Chelmsford Lions 21st century MIAA State Championships include:
 2000: Wrestling Division 1 MIAA State Champions
 2002: Boys Swimming & Diving Division 1 MIAA State Champions
 2003: Boys Swimming & Diving Division 1 MIAA State Champions
 2004: Boys Swimming & Diving Division 1 MIAA State Champions
 2006: Girls Gymnastics Division 1 MIAA State Champions
 2007: Football Eastern Massachusetts Division 1 Super Bowl Champions
 2008: Girls Swimming & Diving Division 1 MIAA State Champions
 2013: Girls Swimming & Diving Division 1 MIAA State Champions
 2016: Wrestling Division 1 MIAA State Champions 

 2018: Wrestling Division 1 MIAA State Champions

Notable alumni
Notable Chelmsford High School alumni include:
 Keith Aucoin, former NHL player for the Carolina Hurricanes, Washington Capitals, Norwich University
Nancy Bauer, author and nonfiction writer
Jeff Bauman, author and survivor of the Boston Marathon bombing
Phil Bourque, former NHL player for the Pittsburgh Penguins
 Gerry Callahan, radio show host, sports journalist, and podcaster
 Dawn Clements, artist and teacher
 George Condo, visual artist
 Bill Cooke, former NFL player for the Green Bay Packers and San Francisco 49ers
 Dan Curran, former NFL player for the Seattle Seahawks and New Orleans Saints
 Jack Eichel, NHL player for the Vegas Golden Knights
J. Bryan Hehir, theologian, professor at Harvard University, Secretary for Social Services for the Archdiocese of Boston, MacArthur Fellow
Heather Linstad, college ice hockey coach for the University of Connecticut Huskies
 Greg Marcks, film director and screenwriter, 11:14, Echelon Conspiracy
Mark T. Maybury, 33rd Chief Scientist to the United States Air Force, chief scientific adviser to the Chief of Staff of the Air Force and Secretary of the U.S. Air Force
 Sean McAdam, sports journalist and author
Jon Morris, former NHL player for the New Jersey Devils and Boston Bruins
 Colleen Mullen, college basketball coach for the University at Albany Great Danes and former player
Marc Pelchat, Olympic speed skater
Peter H. Reynolds, author and illustrator of children's books
 John Traphagan, anthropologist and author, professor at the University of Texas at Austin
 Lance Wilder, animator and longtime background designer on The Simpsons

References

External links

 CHS official website
 Chelmsford Public Schools

Merrimack Valley Conference
Public high schools in Massachusetts
Schools in Middlesex County, Massachusetts
Chelmsford, Massachusetts
1974 establishments in Massachusetts